Stony Fork or Stoney Fork may refer to:

Stony Fork Creek, a tributary of Babb Creek in Pennsylvania
Stoney Fork, Kentucky, an unincorporated community in Bell County

See also
Stony Fork Junction, Kentucky